Bastien Vincent, known by his stage name Maska (born 21 May 1985 in Paris), is a French rapper and dancer. He is a founding member of the French rap/hip hop collective Sexion d'Assaut.

In October 2014, Maska released his first solo album, Espace-temps, which ranked 14th on the Top Albums in France.

Early life 
Originally from Lozère, he grew up in Paris in the 9th arrondissement while mingling with his friends, most of whom would later become part of the hip hop group Sexion d'Assault. He grew up in a rich neighborhood despite his family having a substandard income, a situation much early in Bastien's life which would leave him with feelings of unease. Having experienced a musical awakening quite young thanks to his parents, Maska became a fan of French rap who, unlike Gims, ended up receiving a rather American musical education, influenced by Sisqó, Michael Jackson, The Beatles, The Rolling Stones and Johnny Clegg.

Career

Sexion d'Assaut (2002–2013) 
Around 2003 Maska obtained his baccalaureate and proceeded to undertake higher studies. He wrote songs and rapped alongside his acquaintances Black M and Barack Adama . He mentioned having been saved by music and religion in the lyrics of his single "La tâche".

Maska released several records with the group Sexion d'Assaut, including two studio albums, L'École des points vitaux in 2010 and L'Apogée in 2012, as well as three mixtapes, two street albums, a live album, three DVDs, a compilation and a reissue.

Solo career (since 2012) 

After the success of the Sexion d'Assaut, in October 2014, Maska released his first solo album entitled Espace-temps, which ranked 14th on the Top Albums in France. Before the release of the album, he uploaded the music video for the song "Rahh". He also offered a series of videos, Espace temps, including: "Mon mal être" (feat. Dr Bériz), "Un grain de folie", "Ca va rire", "Parcours de rêve", and "Laisse passer l'artiste". On March 14, 2014, Maska unveiled the first track of his next album "Drapeau Taché de Sang".

During Planète Rap of Black M, he also unveiled an excerpt from a new song entitled "Prie pour moi" featuring Gims, which was released in full on the Internet on May 9, 2014. After more than two years of work, on October 13, 2017, he revealed on his first mixtape, Akhal-Teke, then a second one, Préliminaires, Vol. 1, released on June 29, 2018, where he introduced a radical change of style. From September 2018, he worked on his third mixtape, Préliminaires Vol. 2, which was released on March 29, 2019.

Achievements 
Subliminal of Gims, "Où Est Ton Arme?". Being a founding member of the Sexion d'Assaut group, Maska takes part in many of the collective's most notable songs: "Avant qu'elle parte", "Ma Direction", "Problèmes D'Adultes", "Cérémonie", "A Bout de souffle" or even "Ils appellent ça".

Maska contributes to the writing of collective lyrics, collaborating frequently with French singers such as Kendji Girac, Vianney, Dadju or Zaho.

Discography

With Sexion d'Assaut 

Studio albums
 L'École des points vitaux (2010)
 L'Apogée (2012)

Compilation albums
 La Terre du Milieu (2006)
 Les Chroniques du 75 (2009)
 En attendant L'Apogée: les Chroniques du 75 (2011)

Mixtapes
 Le Renouveau (2008)
 L'Écrasement de tête (2009)

Live albums
 L'Apogée à Bercy (2012)

Albums

Mixtapes

EPs

Singles

*Did not appear in the official Belgian Ultratop 50 charts, but rather in the bubbling under Ultratip charts.

Featured in

References

Rappers from Paris
1985 births
Living people